Butterfly and Sword is a 1993 Hong Kong wuxia film loosely based on the novel Liuxing Hudie Jian by Gu Long. Directed by Michael Mak, the film starred Tony Leung, Michelle Yeoh, Jimmy Lin, Joey Wong and Donnie Yen.

Plot
Butterfly has nothing to do with the martial arts world. Her father was once a renowned member of the martial arts world, but she is just another young girl deeply in love with Meng Sing Wan. They live happily in a small hut next to a river, where he spends time trying to catch fish, and writing poetry. From time to time, Sing has to go away on business to earn money, that's what he tells her anyway, but the horrifying truth is that he is an assassin.

He is a member of the Happy Forest, a group of assassins led by Sister Ko, but he is tired of the never-ending life of killing for a living. Yip is another member of the group, and is Sing's best friend. The both of them, along with Sister Ko, and a girl called Ho Ching grew up together, forming the best of Happy Forest. Yip is in love with Sister Ko, but is afraid to tell her. However, Ko only has eyes for Sing, but Sing regards her only as an older sister.

Ko is given a mission by the Grand Eunuch Tsao, who instructs her to steal a letter from the hands of Master Suen from the Elites Villa sect, who was given to him by Grand Eunuch Li, Tsao's adversary in court. Ko tells Sing to fake his own death, then enter Suen's service as a lone swordsman. Sing does this and more. He impresses Suen with his skills and soon has his trust. At this time however, he encounters Suen's girl, who looks remarkably like the Ho Ching that once disappeared many years ago. Suen sees Sing's interest in his woman, and so, gives her to him.

But on the night of the wedding, Ho Ching tries to steal the message, but fail and dies. Sing is devastated by her death, and he goes back to Happy Forest, confronting Ko as to why he wasn't told that Ho Ching was alive all this time, and was being an undercover. Ko is upset by Sing's outburst, only wanting what is best for all of them. Ko and Yip forces into Suen's Elites Villa, and with Sing already inside, they are able to defeat Suen and take the message. When Ko and Sing deliver the message to Eunuch Tsao, it is revealed that Eunuch Li is really Eunuch Tsao, and that he hatched up the plan to destroy the people of the martial arts world. In the end, Tsao is defeated by the teamwork of Ko, Sing, and a young prince.

Cast
Tony Leung as Meng Sing Wan
Michelle Yeoh as Lady Ko
Jimmy Lin as Prince Cha
Joey Wong as Butterfly
Donnie Yen as Yip Cheung
Tok Chung-wa as Lui Heung Chuen
Elvis Tsui as Lord Suen Yuk Pa
Yip Chuen-chan as Miu Siu Siu / Ho Ching
Lee Ka-ting as Lui Chung Yuen
Chang Kuo-chu as Eunuch Tsao / Li Shu Tin
Wong Chung-kui as eunuch
Cho Boon-feng as bald fighter
Choi Hin-cheung as Lord Suen's man
Lee Wai
Wong Yiu
Lam Gwong-chun

External links

1993 films
1993 action films
Hong Kong action films
1990s Cantonese-language films
Wuxia films
1990s Hong Kong films